Ángela Vargas Vega, better known by her artistic name of Angelita Vargas (born in Seville in 1946) is a Romani Spanish flamenco dancer and singer, considered one of the greatest stars of the Andalusian music scene. New York Magazine said that she "uses her legs like a compass — one foot pivoting in place while the other delicately taps out a circle — a second time, the "specialty" seems to degenerate into a trick." 
She is married to El Biencasao, and is the mother of dancer Joselito (Jose Cortes Vargas).

Dancing since the age of 3, by 8 she was performing in a group called "La Gitanilla" throughout Spain. She performed in a group at Expo 98. She has performed in Great Britain, North America, Japan, Netherlands and Germany and is a recipient of the Premio Pastora Imperio (Córdoba, 1980) and the Premio Nacional al baile de la Cátedra de Flamencología (Jerez, 1986).

See also
Women in dance

References

External links
Official site

Spanish female dancers
Flamenco dancers
1946 births
Living people
People from Seville
Romani singers
Romani dancers
Spanish Romani people